My Daughter Doesn't Do That is a 1940 German romantic comedy film directed by Hans H. Zerlett and starring Ralph Arthur Roberts, Erika von Thellmann, and Geraldine Katt.

The film's sets were designed by the art directors  and Erich Czerwonski.

Cast

References

Bibliography

External links 
 

1940 films
Films of Nazi Germany
German romantic comedy films
1940 romantic comedy films
1940s German-language films
Films directed by Hans H. Zerlett
German black-and-white films
1940s German films